Hurley Priory is a former Benedictine priory in the village of Hurley. Founded in 1086, the remains are located on the banks of the River Thames in the English county of Berkshire.

History
The Priory of St. Mary at Hurley was founded in 1086 by the Norman magnate Geoffrey de Mandeville I as a cell of Westminster Abbey.

The Priory was suppressed by Henry VIII in 1536, and ownership was transferred to Westminster Abbey. In 1540 Westminster Abbey was dissolved and the Hurley Priory property passed into lay hands. 

The main Abbey property became known as Lady Place. It was initially owned by Charles Howard, Esq., for three years, then by Leonard Chamberleyn, Esq., then by John Lovelace, Esq. It was used as the residence of the Barons Lovelace. Lady Place was considered one of the great mansions in town, but it fell into disrepair and was demolished as uninhabitable in 1837.

Surviving buildings
The long narrow nave of the priory church survives and is used as the Hurley parish church. It has mainly Norman windows and doorways. To the north, the range of buildings containing the frater or monastic dining hall is incorporated into a private house. A probable monastic circular dovecote and a nearby larger barn, both to the west of the church, date from the early fourteenth century. The Abbey's former hostelry or guesthouse is incorporated into the Olde Bell Inn, one of the oldest still-working inns in Britain.

Burials
Richard Lovelace, 1st Baron Lovelace
John Lovelace, 2nd Baron Lovelace
John Lovelace, 3rd Baron Lovelace

See also
List of English abbeys, priories and friaries serving as parish churches

Notes

References
Geoffrey N. Wright Discovering Abbeys and Priories 

Monasteries in Berkshire
Buildings and structures in the Royal Borough of Windsor and Maidenhead
Church of England church buildings in Berkshire
1086 establishments in England
Christian monasteries established in the 11th century
Benedictine monasteries in England
1536 disestablishments in England
History of the River Thames
de Mandeville family
Hurley, Berkshire